Sir David's long-beaked echidna (Zaglossus attenboroughi), also known as Attenborough's long-beaked echidna or the Cyclops long-beaked echidna, is one of the three species from the genus Zaglossus that occurs in New Guinea. It is named in honour of naturalist Sir David Attenborough. It lives in the Cyclops Mountains, which are near the cities of Sentani and Jayapura in the Indonesian province of Papua.

Description
It is the smallest member of the genus Zaglossus, being closer in size to the short-beaked echidna (Tachyglossus aculeatus). The male is larger than the female, and can be differentiated by the spurs on its hind legs.

The echidna is not a social animal, and comes together with its own kind only once a year, in July, to mate. The female will lay the eggs after about eight days, and the babies will stay in the mother's pouch for around eight weeks or until their spines develop. The creature is nocturnal, and can roll up into a spiny ball when it feels threatened, somewhat in the manner of a hedgehog.
Subsequent systematic revision of Zaglossus by Flannery & Groves (1998) identified three allopatric species and several subspecies occurring across the island, and these authors erected the new species Z. attenboroughi (Attenborough’s long-beaked echidna) to describe a single echidna specimen (Plate 1) collected in 1961 at 1,600 m near the top of Mount Rara, in the Cyclops Mountains of northern Dutch New Guinea (now the Indonesian province of Papua).

Conservation
The species was described from a single damaged specimen collected in the Dutch colonial era (c. 1961), and has apparently not been collected since then. Given the ongoing anthropogenic disturbance of the Cyclops Mountain forest habitat, this has raised concern that Z. attenboroughi populations may already be endangered or even locally extirpated. However, biological surveys of Papua province are notoriously incomplete; it is possible that the animal still exists there or in related mountain ranges. The echidna is endangered by hunting and habitat loss. In fact, it was thought to be extinct until some of its "nose pokes" were found in the mountains of New Guinea. These "nose pokes" are very distinctive and result from the echidna's feeding technique.

The diet of this hardy animal consists of earthworms, termites, insect larvae and ants. This animal is so high in the endangered-species list that locals are being educated about the creature and asked to stop their tradition of hunting and killing it to share it with rivals as a peace offering. As reported on July 15, 2007, researchers from EDGE visiting Papua's Cyclops Mountains had recently discovered burrows and tracks thought to be those of Zaglossus attenboroughi. Furthermore, communication with local people revealed that the species had perhaps been seen as recently as 2005. In 2007, Sir David's long-beaked echidna was identified as one of the top-10 "focal species" by the Evolutionarily Distinct and Globally Endangered (EDGE) project. The echidna is among the 25 "most wanted lost" species that are the focus of Global Wildlife Conservation's "Search for Lost Species" initiative.

See also
 List of things named after David Attenborough and his works

References

External links

 http://news.bbc.co.uk/2/hi/science/nature
 EDGE of Existence (Zaglossus spp.) – Saving the World's most Evolutionarily Distinct and Globally Endangered (EDGE) species

Monotremes of New Guinea
Endemic fauna of New Guinea
Mammals of Western New Guinea
Critically endangered fauna of Oceania
EDGE species
Mammals described in 1998
Taxa named by Tim Flannery
Taxa named by Colin Groves
David Attenborough
Species known from a single specimen